The Cliffy Island Lighthouse is located atop Cliffy Island, a steep-sided island which is the summit of a granite submarine mountain in the Bass Strait. Cliffy Island is located about 32 kilometres directly south of Port Albert, and roughly 38 kilometres to the northeast of Wilsons Promontory Lighthouse in Victoria, Australia. The lighthouse warns approaching vessels of rocks in Bass Strait by emitting a flash of white light every five seconds. The focal plane of the lightsource and Fresnel lens is situated 52 metres above sea level. The site is managed by the Victoria Department of Conservation and Natural Resources, while the lighthouse itself is operated by the Australian Maritime Safety Authority (AMSA). The island is accessible only by helicopter, and the entire site is closed to the public.

History
Cliffy Island lighthouse was constructed on site in 1884 from granite quarried on the island. In addition to the lighthouse, there was a stone cottage for the head lighthouse keeper and his family. This structure was nearly identical to the one at Cape Nelson (they were both built in the same year, probably from the same set of blueprints). There was also a duplex wooden structure that served as the residence of the two assistant keepers and their families. The keeper's houses were demolished in 1971, when the lighthouse was automated; the stone walls that surrounded the houses remain.

Adjacent Lighthouses
 South West - Wilsons Promontory Lighthouse
 North East - Lighthouse at Cape Conran Coastal Park
 North East - Point Hicks Lighthouse

See also

 List of lighthouses in Australia

References

Further reading
 Diving Australia by Peter Stone
 From Dusk Till Dawn by Gordon Reid
 The Lighthouses of Victoria by Dacre Smyth
 The Melbourne Truth

External links

 Map showing location of Cliffy Island lighthouse
 Parks Victoria - Parks Victoria is the custodian of a diverse estate of significant parks in Victoria
 

Lighthouses completed in 1884
Lighthouses in Victoria (Australia)